Fulthorpe is a surname. Notable people with the surname include:

Helen Fulthorpe, contestant on season 11 of The X Factor
Robert Fulthorpe (1683–1753), English lawyer and politician